Rimavské Brezovo is a village and municipality in the Rimavská Sobota District of the Banská Bystrica Region of southern Slovakia. Among the most important sightseeings belong historical municipal house, evangelical church from 13th century and a historical mining company building. Inside the evangelical church are gothic wall paintings from 18th century.

References

External links
 
Statisticks.sk

Villages and municipalities in Rimavská Sobota District